KHNA-LP (94.3 FM) is a low-power FM radio station broadcasting a Catholic Radio format. Licensed to Sheridan, Wyoming, US, the station is currently owned by Aperio Radio, Inc.
The transmitter for the station is located in downtown Sheridan atop an office building.

History
The Federal Communications Commission issued a construction permit for the station on September 22, 2014. The station was assigned the KHNA-LP call sign on November 13, 2014 and received its license to cover on December 18, 2014.

References

External links
 

HNA-LP
Radio stations established in 2015
Catholic radio stations
2015 establishments in Wyoming
HNA-LP